So Fresh: The Hits of Autumn 2016 is a compilation album which has 22 tracks. The album was released on 18 March 2016, and peaked at number one on the ARIA Compilations Chart.
The album has been certified gold for shipment of 35,000 units.

Track listing

Weekly charts

Certifications

References

2016 in Australian music
2016 compilation albums
So Fresh albums